The Hochschule für bildende Künste Hamburg (HFBK Hamburg) is the University of Fine Arts of Hamburg. It dates to 1767, when it was called the Hamburger Gewerbeschule; later it became known as Landeskunstschule Hamburg. The main building, located in the Uhlenhorst quarter of Hamburg-Nord borough, was designed by architect Fritz Schumacher, and built between 1911 and 1913. In 1970, it was accredited as an artistic-scientific university.

History
The Hamburger Gewerbeschule (Hamburg Vocational School) was founded in 1767 by the Patriotische Gesellschaft (Patriotic Society). It was named the Staatliche Kunstgewerbeschule (School of Arts and Crafts or School of Applied Arts) in 1896, later the Landeskunstschule Hamburg (State School of Art). 

Fritz Schumacher designed the main building especially for the art school. Located at Am Lerchenfeld 2 in Uhlenhorst, a quarter of Hamburg-Nord, it was built between 1911 and 1913. After World War II, it re-opened as the Landeskunstschule by Friedrich Ahlers-Hestermann, who had previously been a professor at the Kölner Werkschulen (Cologne Academy of Fine Arts). He was succeeded by architect Gustav Hassenpflug, who changed the institution to the Hochschule für bildende Künste Hamburg. The school was accredited as a university in 1970.

Protests (2007)
In July 2007, a scandal occurred when the university administration under Martin Köttering came under political pressure to expel students for having protested newly introduced tuition fees. Joerg Draeger and the Hamburg Senate, dominated by the Christian Democratic Union (CDU) demanded expulsion of more than half of the art students for having taken part in a tuition boycott. The scandal gained nationwide press coverage. In June 2008, about 680 students were enrolled at HFBK Hamburg.

Memorials
Two stolpersteine – memorials to victims of Nazism – were laid for two faculty members in 2009 by then president of HFBK Peter Hess and members of the Hamburg-Walddörfer Lions Club. The stolpersteine were laid for Friedrich Adler, who taught at the Kunstgewerbeschule from 1907 until his forced retirement in 1933, who was killed in Auschwitz in 1942, and Hugo Meier-Thur, who taught from 1910 to 1943, was killed at Fuhlsbüttel concentration camp in 1943.

Notable alumni 

This list includes alumni from University of Fine Arts of Hamburg, listed by last name alphabetical order.

Notable academic staff 

This list includes present and past academic staff, listed by last name alphabetical order. 

 Friedrich Adler (1878–1942), design, metalwork
 Joseph Beuys, guest professor in 1974
 Max Bill (1908–1994), professor from 1967–1974
 Bazon Brock, professor 1965–1976
 Adam Broomberg and Oliver Chanarin, photography
 Bernhard Blume, professor 1987–2011
 Angela Bulloch, sculpture
 John Burgan, guest professor 2002
 Carl Otto Czeschka, professor 1907–1943
 Simon Denny, time-based media
 Gotthard Graubner, professor 1969–
 Rudolf Hausner, professor
 Alfred Hrdlicka, professor 1973–1975
 Friedensreich Hundertwasser, professor 1959
 Jutta Koether, painting
 Isaac Julien, professor 2006
 Sigmar Polke, professor
 Dieter Rams, professor 1981−1997
 Anselm Reyle, guest professor
 Helke Sander, professor 1981–2003
 Edwin Scharff
 Paul Schneider-Esleben, professor 1961–1972
 Paul Wunderlich, professor 1963–1968
 Carl Vogel, professor 1962–1989, president 1976–1989

References

External links
Official website
Hochschule für Bildende Künste Hamburg eastchance.com
Hochschule für bildende Künste Hamburg wissenschaft.hamburg.de 
Hochschule für bildende Künste Hamburg Das Bildungs- und Studenten-Portal 
Hochschule für bildende Künste Hamburg kulturkarte.de 

 
Buildings and structures in Hamburg-Nord
Educational institutions established in 1767
1767 establishments in the Holy Roman Empire
Universities and colleges in Hamburg